The women's 10 metre platform, also reported as high diving, was one of four diving events on the diving at the 1928 Summer Olympics programme. The competition was actually held from both 10 metre and 5 metre boards. Divers performed a total of four compulsory dives: a standing plain header and running plain header from both the 10 metre and 5 metre platforms. The competition was held on Friday 10 August 1928, and on Saturday 11 August 1928. Seventeen divers from eight nations competed.

Results

First round
The three divers who scored the smallest number of points in each group of the first round advanced to the final.

Group 1

Group 2

Final

References

Sources
 
 

Women
1928
1928 in women's diving
Div